Achereshki (Açarşka), also spelled as Achireshki, is a rural locality (a selo) in Kurchaloyevsky District, Chechnya.

Administrative and municipal status 
Municipally, Achereshki is incorporated into Regitinskoye rural settlement. It is one of four settlements included in it.

Geography 

Achereshki is located on the left bank of the Gums River.

The nearest settlements to Achireshki are Khidi-Khutor in the north, Koren-Benoy in the north-east, Enikali in the south-east, Guni in the south-west, Marzoy-Mokhk in the west, and Regita in the north-west.

History 
The exact date of Achereshki being founded is unknown, but it is presumed that it was approximately in 1810.

In 1944, after the genocide and deportation of the Chechen and Ingush people and the Chechen-Ingush ASSR was abolished, the village of Regita was renamed to Antsukh, and settled by Avars from the Georgian SSR.

In 1958, after the Vaynakh people returned and the Chechen-Ingush ASSR was restored, the village regained its old Chechen name, Achereshki. The Avar people were resettled back to the Georgian SSR, in the village of Tivi (Gurgin-Rosu).

Population 
 1990 Census: 242
 2002 Census: 482
 2010 Census: 252
 2019 estimate: ?

According to the results of the 2010 Census, the majority of residents of Achereshki were ethnic Chechens.

References 

Rural localities in Kurchaloyevsky District